Robin Crispin William Odey (born January 1959) is a London-based hedge fund manager and the founding partner of Odey Asset Management. In April 2011 the firm had $6.5 to $7 billion under management, with Odey personally running $4 billion of assets. According to Bloomberg in November 2017, he is "known for his bearish outlook" on the markets.

According to The Sunday Times Rich List in 2020, Odey and his then wife Nichola Pease were worth £825 million.

Early life and education
Odey was born in the East Riding of Yorkshire, the only son of (George) Richard Odey. His father was from a family of Yorkshire industrialists, and his grandfather George Odey, "a formidable bully", had been the Conservative MP for Beverley. His mother was from the Clitherow family. In 1980, his sister Caroline married the Hon. Henry David Montgomery, the son of David Montgomery, 2nd Viscount Montgomery of Alamein and (heir apparent to the viscountcy). They have three children.

He was educated at Harrow School, where his father had been head boy, and graduated from Christ Church, Oxford in 1980 with a degree in history and economics. Soon after graduation, he found out that his father had huge debts, and the trustees made him responsible for Hotham Hall, a 4,000-acre estate that had been in his mother's family since 1720. Aged 23, he sold everything. According to Odey, his father was a "wastrel from beginning to end", and survived on handouts from his son.

Career

Early funds
After university Odey qualified as a barrister but instead of taking up a legal career, he joined Framlington fund managers, and then left to work for Barings International, where he managed the Baring European Growth Trust. He ran continental European pension funds at Framlington and Barings.

1991–2015: Odey Asset Management founding
Odey founded Odey Asset Management in 1991. George Soros was one of the original investors, seeding Odey $150 million. Odey suffered large losses in 1994 when the Federal Reserve unexpectedly lifted interest rates (one of his funds lost 44 per cent of its value), but went on to thrive, for instance by foreseeing that the value of insurers would rise after the September 11 attacks on New York in 2001. Through the early part of the 2000s, Odey worked closely with Hugh Hendry, whom he had recruited and who ran Odey's top performing Continental Europe Fund. Hendry left in 2005 to establish Eclectica Asset Management. In reference to Hendry, Odey himself said: "Odey in the 1990s was a one-man band; Odey in the 2000s was a two-man band".

According to The New York Times, Odey "came to prominence during the 2008 financial crisis when he shorted banking shares, a lucrative wager that helped him to earn almost 28 million pounds that year". That year his return was 54.8 per cent. He had been bearish about the position of banks for a number of years, shorting Bradford & Bingley as early as 2005, questioning the German landesbanks and warning consistently about the dangers of debt and inflated house prices. He continued his short positions into early 2009 but in April took longer positions as he predicted the market rally of that year. The Times newspaper selected Odey as a "Business Big Shot" in 2008.

In May 2009, Odey attracted some controversy for saying in The Times that he would leave the country to avoid paying 50% income tax. He was at the centre of further controversy in 2009 when it was suggested that he financially backed anti-EU campaigners in the Irish referendum on the Lisbon Treaty while some hedge funds had taken out specific bets on the insolvency of the country in the event that the vote not be carried. The Treaty passed by a margin of 67.1 per cent to 32.9 per cent. In faxes sent to RTÉ and TV3, Odey denied that he had funded the Libertas 'no' campaign.

In May 2010, Odey Asset Management formed a new investment management firm with Geneva's Bruellan Wealth Management called Odey Bruellan. Odey Asset Management's Odey European Inc. fund was ranked No. 5 on Bloomberg's 2012 list of the 100 Top-Performing Large Hedge Funds.

2016–2018: Recent career

In 2016, it was reported that Odey saw his personal fortune drop by £200 million after profits at Odey Asset Management suffered a significant decline. His salary was cut because profits were down nearly 45% from the previous year.

In 2016, Odey was a prominent backer of Brexit, arguing it would allow the UK to govern itself. Later that year, his hedge fund won about 15% of its value following the results of the Brexit referendum.  He told the BBC on the morning of the result that he had made £220 million speculating that the markets would fall, saying "'Il mattino ha l'oro in bocca' – the morning has gold in its mouth". Overall, his flagship fund made losses of almost 50% in 2016. The firm's operating profits dropped from 44.3 million pounds to 18.6 million pounds in 2016.

In June 2017, The Daily Telegraph reported that his fund had profited from the drop in the value of the pound that resulted from a hung parliament. In August 2017, he remained an investor in Sky. After initially backing the Fox bid for Sky, in November 2017, he opposed the bid, after Sky's financial results proved "better than people forecast."

Assets under management at the fund dropped from $11.7 billion at the start of 2015, to $5.5 billion in September 2017. Also, funds in his flagship fund, Odey European, fell from €2.5 billion at the start of 2015 to €184 million. The Financial Times chalked the losses in part to "poorly timed" trades. On 5 January 2018, The New York Times reported that Odey Asset Management had lost more than a fifth of its value in 2017, dropping around 20.5 percent.

The New York Times reported that Odey's fund's "performance has suffered heavily after he took a negative stance on the outlook for the global economy and bearish positions against shares that have not borne fruit." He had also made "bets against the Fed", explaining to his clients that "it would certainly be simpler to follow the market. But then we would be ignoring the fundamental data". He had also assumed there would be a crash resulting from high interest rates.

In February 2019, less than two months before the then Brexit date, Odey again bet against the pound.

Personal life
Odey was briefly married to Rupert Murdoch's eldest daughter, Prudence, although the pair quickly separated. The marriage lasted 15 months.

He subsequently married Nichola Pease, deputy chairman of JO Hambro Capital Management and a member of one of the founding families of Barclays Bank. Odey had no children by his first wife, and two sons and one daughter by his second wife.

In May 2020, Odey was charged with indecent assault following a complaint by a woman over an incident in 1998. Odey denied the charge at Westminster Magistrates' Court on 28 September and he was bailed to appear at Hendon magistrates' court on 17 February 2021. Following a trial at Westminster Magistrates' Court in March 2021 Odey was cleared of the charge.

See also
Edward Chancellor
List of alumni of Christ Church, Oxford

References

Living people
1959 births
Crispin
People from the East Riding of Yorkshire
People from Chelsea, London
People educated at Harrow School
Alumni of Christ Church, Oxford
British billionaires
English money managers
British hedge fund managers
Businesspeople from Yorkshire
People acquitted of sex crimes
British Eurosceptics